The Welsh Sports Association (WSA) (established 1972) is an independent, umbrella body, supporting and representing the national and international interests of all the national governing bodies (NGBs) of sport and physical recreation in Wales. It has a membership of over 60 NGBs. The WSA acts as an independent consultative body to the Welsh Assembly Government, Sport Wales and to UK Sport.

The Welsh Sports Association is based at the Sport Wales National Centre, Sophia Gardens, Cardiff.

References

 
1972 establishments in Wales